The Wolseley Hornet is a six-cylinder twelve fiscal horsepower lightweight automobile which was offered as a saloon car, coupé and open two-seater as well as the usual rolling chassis for bespoke coachwork. Produced by Wolseley Motors Limited from 1930 until 1936, the Hornet was unveiled to the public at the end of April 1930. Wolseley had been bought from the receivers by William Morris in 1927. 

This car's tiny six-cylinder engine, Motor Sport magazine described it as a miniature six, reflected the brief vogue for less vibratory 6, 8, 12 and 16 cylinder engines soon superseded by greatly improved flexible engine mountings. Their overhead camshaft engines were so good that cars built on their Hornet Special chassis developed an outstanding reputation on the road and in club competition.

The initial offering was something of a quart in a pint pot, tiny but powerful for its size. Furthermore, four passengers might be fitted into the very lightly constructed car. However the market soon required more room and more comfort and the car's nature changed. This was countered by making and selling the Special with a more highly tuned engine. The last Hornet was replaced, following acquisition of Wolseley by Morris Motors, with Morris's badge-engineered Wolseley 12/48, announced 24 April 1936.

Bodies

1930

Initial offering
Announced at the end of April 1930 — though ownership was quite separate from Morris Motors — the first Wolseley Hornet was in effect a 2-door 4-seater Morris Minor saloon fitted with an extended engine bay to make room for a small six-cylinder engine in place of the four-cylinder unit that was normal for this size of car.

The new Hornet was supplied as an enclosed four-seater two-door saloon with coachbuilt body or, for £10 less, fabric body; as an open two-seater or as a bare "rolling" chassis for the owner's choice of coachwork.

Revision
In the autumn of 1930 the lack of body room and difficult access to the interior was recognised by Wolseley and new four-seater two-door coachwork was provided which was considerably longer and wider with wider doors.

Sunshine roofs were now made available. Separate front bucket-type seats were adjustable and Wolseley claimed the back seat gave plenty of leg and headroom for two adults. The four windows slid open and had locking devices. Safety glass was fitted throughout.

Catalogue 30 April 1931

Initial offering remained available
Fabric saloon £175
Coachbuilt saloon £185
Revision model with longer and wider body:
Fabric saloon £185
Fabric sunshine saloon £187.10.0
Coachbuilt sunshine saloon £195
Semi-sports two-seater £198
Two-seater coupé £215

Coachbuilders

Some of the popular bodies were made by:
 Swallow Coachbuilding (S. S.): open 2-seater £220, 4-seater £225
 Boyd-Carpenter: open 2-seater £232.10, fixed head coupé £250
 Abbey: open 4-seater £235
 Eustace Watkins: open 4-seater £220, EW Tickford coupé £245

1931 Olympia Motor Show
Responding to demand Wolseley presented a much roomier four-door saloon with wind-up windows.
One month before the Motor Show agents from all over the country were called to Birmingham to see the new Hornet four door saloon. A changed design for the engine's drive to the camshaft allowed a shorter engine which could now be placed further forward in the chassis and the bodywork could be more capacious. A silent third four-speed gearbox was added to the car's equipment.

The Autocar published its road test on announcement day, 25 September 1931. Autocar's testers were pleased with the result of the engine being moved 8 inches (20 cm) forward, weight distribution was better and the ride more comfortable for all passengers, no tossing them about over appalling surfaces and no pitching at all. Weight and wind resistance were increased but at 64 miles per hour this car was faster than the last Hornet tested. The performance of the new third gear in the new four-speed gearbox was much admired. "Altogether the new Wolseley Hornet is a fascinating small car. It offers a very high degree of comfort and convenience, possesses an excellent performance, yet runs with complete refinement. It gives an extraordinary combination of economy and an ability to do all that the majority of owners can possibly require."

A 21st century reader might better understand the gear-changing difficulties of early motoring compounded by the lack of syncromesh gearboxes by reading this excerpt from that 1931 Autocar roadtest: "To obtain the best out of the car it is desirable to use the gearbox sensibly, and to change down early. . . . This is a matter of small consequence, for the reason that the gear change is extraordinarily easy to accomplish between top and third without paying much attention to the use of the accelerator pedal. All the same the gear change responds just as readily to the more orthodox style of handling, and a little practice with double-clutching and finding the right pauses soon gives a quiet mastery."

1932
During 1932 Wolseley added two and four-seat coupés to the range.

The display at Olympia was two four-door six-light saloons with soft leather upholstery and sliding roofs.

Special chassis
On 18 April 1932 a Special chassis with engine and other modifications was also made available but only as a chassis, at a cost of £175 and it made for itself an enduring reputation. More information is provided below.

1933
New Hornets were shown at Olympia in the autumn beside the continuing 7 ft 6½ins wheelbase four-door saloon and occasional four coupé which were not fitted with freewheel but did have the quiet-third four-speed gearboxes with new syncromesh on all but first gear.

Two new Hornets shown were: a four-door saloon and an occasional four on a new 7 ft 11ins wheelbase. The engines of the new cars had a single camshaft drive in place of the earlier two-stage chain drive. Propeller shaft universal joints were now metal in place of their fabric predecessors. On the freewheel cars the frame was now underslung at the rear. Automatic restarting of the engine was provided. Electric direction indicators were now built into the body pillars.

1934
A new form of gearbox was announced in the autumn of 1934, preselective with a finger-operated lever below the steering wheel. By the driver's left hand was a small additional lever which selected forward neutral or reverse. A standard type of clutch was operated by the first part of the pedal's travel. The rest of the travel changed the gears as preselected. A freewheel was provided on the indirect ratios though it could be locked out on second gear to provide engine-braking.

1935
New more powerful, roomy and pleasing in design Hornet (and Wasp) models with special easy clean wheels were shown to the motor trade at a Birmingham gathering on 29 April 1935.  The range was rationalised to a standard saloon and coupé. But six weeks later, in the middle of June, it was announced that W R Morris had sold Wolseley to Morris Motors and the transfer of ownership would take effect on 1 July 1935. So the 1935 Hornet saloon and coupé were replaced just twelve months later by a badge-engineered Morris Twelve labelled Wolseley 12/48.

Post mortem
When launched in 1930 the Hornet came with a UK retail price of £175 and could be seen as a competitively priced small saloon with unusually brisk performance but the saloon gained in overall weight and lost the well judged weight distribution that gave the early Hornets much of their market-place appeal.

Wolseley engines

At the beginning of the 1920s Wolseley had been UK's largest motor manufacturer, over-expansion had been the downfall of the owners of the business but Wolseley retained considerable technical expertise. One result was the very successful overhead camshaft six-cylinder engine sold in this car.  Wolseley Aero Engines Limited was formed around 1931 specifically to separate out and capitalise on this expertise.

When Wolseley Motors Limited was transferred to Morris Motors Limited on 1 July 1935 this part of its business was set aside by W. R. Morris (Lord Nuffield) and put in the ownership of a newly incorporated company, Wolseley Aero Engines Ltd, and remained his personal property. It later became Nuffield Mechanizations Limited.

William Morris began to capitalise on Wolseley's products with the 847 cc Wolseley designed engine he put in his 1928 Morris Minor. The Hornet engine can be viewed as a 1928-design Morris Minor engine with two more cylinders. A re-design of both engines by Morris engines branch led to a less costly product for the Morris range, a side-valve replacement for the two-seater Morris Minor at first called the Morris Minor S.V. and announced at Christmas-time 1930. The Minor's OHC engine continued in production for the rest of the Minor range, lastly in the Morris Family Eight. The full Minor range was replaced by the side-valve 918cc Morris Eight range announced in late August 1934.

A 1378cc side-valve version of the 6-cylinder was used in the Morris Ten Six announced in August 1933.

Hornet engines

1930
The new car was given a small (1271cc) six-cylinder engine with a single overhead camshaft. The overhead camshaft followed the Wolseley custom begun by their 2-litre 16/45 6-cylinder engine announced in September 1926 — just before the change of ownership.

1931
For the new four-door saloon announced in September 1931 the engine was modified to make it shorter and it was moved forwards on its chassis.  The dynamo had been moved from in front to the side of the engine and the drive to the camshaft was now by two-stage chain instead of by the dynamo and spiral bevel gears.
Meanwhile the same basic design, but with the original vertical dynamo, was supplied by Wolseley to MG (which was also at this time owned by William Morris but not as part of the Morris Motors empire). The nearest match to the 1932 Hornet Special was the MG F-type, although the chassis details were less similar, as the Hornet had hydraulic brakes while the MG had cable operation.

1934
To match the new body the engine grew to 1378 cc by lengthening its stroke from 83mm to 90mm yet it remained a 12 hp engine for tax purposes.

Hornet Special chassis were made available with the same long stroke and with a larger bore — increased from 57mm to 61.5mm — and a swept area of 1604 cc. This enlarged engine was from Wolseley's New Fourteen.

MG engines

This engine was also used in the MG F-type and MG L-type Magnas, and MG K-type and MG N-type Magnettes and a side-valve version in Morris cars.

There are significant differences between the MG F-type engine and that of the Hornet Special. Here is a list - Hornet first, then MG:

Camshaft drive by two-stage chain drive, Dynamo driven by V-belt - Camshaft driven by vertical Dynamo.

Water pump driven from skew gear (which also drives the distributor) - Cooling by thermosyphon only.

Two inlet manifolds, three exhaust connections, branched exhaust system - Inlet and exhaust in one manifold, running up, forwards and down.

Oil feed from steel sump includes pre-filter (under suction) - Oil drawn from cast light-alloy sump.

Hydraulic Brakes - Cable brakes.

These differences mean that most of the connections and pipework are not remotely interchangeable between Hornet Specials and F-types.

Brakes suspension steering
Steering is by worm and wheel, both back and front springs are half elliptical controlled by Luvax hydraulic dampers, Lockheed hydraulic brakes are fitted on all four wheels.

The standard specification includes twelve volt lighting, electrically operated dip and switch headlamps and combined stop and tail lamps, single wiper with provision for a second blade,  chrome finish on all bright parts, petrol gauge, bumpers etc. There is a concealed spare wheel under a metal cover on the back panel and a fold-down luggage grid.

Although from September 1931 the saloon was supplied with a four-speed gear box the two-door cars remained available but with three-speed gearboxes.

Saloon road test

1933
The Times correspondents commented in early 1933: "the car has a large body space for its wheelbase with its engine well forward and body taken considerably behind the rear axle and good leg elbow and head room had been provided within it. . . .  The large windscreen might open farther.  . . . The scuttle can be ventilated, the front seat is adjustable. Below the temperature indicator on the radiator there is an illuminated name badge. The engine was fairly quiet, . . . though third is there to be used. Change-speed actions were normal though a little care was needed to avoid scrape, second gear could have been quieter.  The suspension allows too much movement at the back. . . .  This Wolseley Hornet is a smart-looking car."

1935

The car is now more powerful and roomier and its anatomically correct squabs and pneumatic cushions hold four comfortably. At the back the floor has no footwells, the wheels arches are wide, . . .  "the car tested might well have had ventilators in the scuttle".

On the road "gear changes are not difficult to make, . . . second might be rather quieter. . . . a little care should be taken to come out of a sharp turn at high speed . . . (possibly) . . . large extra low pressure tyres. . . . the front suspension would perhaps be better without any camber. A passenger behind with only two aboard is apt to feel some fore and aft motion not felt in front. Special easy-clean partly disc wheels are fitted."

Duke of Gloucester
The Times reported the Duke of Gloucester had taken delivery of a 1934 saloon model Wolseley Hornet, earlier examples of which he had had for the past two years. The Duke specially commented on two features, the syncromesh gearbox and the enclosed spare wheel.

Hornet Special
Two sporting versions were sold only as Hornet Special "rolling" chassis. The first with Hornet's 1271cc engine, the last with a Wolseley Fourteen 1604cc engine. They were sometimes referred to as Special Speed chassis. Saloon and Tickford coupé as well as sporting bodies were fitted. Later cars had a large S mounted on the radiator cap with a small H for hornet in its lower section, the S shaped to be like a striking snake or a preening swan.

1271cc engine
The new Special chassis was announced 18 April 1932. It had twin carburettors, higher compression (domed pistons) and numerous smaller modifications including a revised exhaust system (triple-piped manifold —2 inch pipe to the straight-through silencer), duplex valve springs, metal universal joints in the propeller shaft, three inches wider front track and specially large 12-inch brake drums. The long flexible gear-lever was replaced by a remote control and a small short-travel lever. Special front (3 inches wider track at 3" 9") and rear axles were supplied with the saloon's large-hub stud-fixed Magna wire-wheels. Small knock-on hubs in Rudge-Whitworth wheels were optional and usually preferred.

A particularly large speedometer (a quick-reading five inch dial), matching engine revolution counter, and ten inch headlights were supplied as part of the complete kit for the coachbuilder. The large headlights were supported by braced mountings included in the kit.

In the autumn of 1933 to improve its breathing the engine was given a cross-flow head with inlet and exhaust manifolds on opposing sides. The block casting was redesigned to increase its stiffness and the Special received the long wheelbase underslung chassis and other modifications of the saloon including freewheel.

The Special chassis was supplied to various specialist coachbuilders particularly Swallow, Whittingham & Mitchel, Jensen and, now also part of the Morris group,  Cunard. 2307 were made.

Coachbuilders

Some of the popular bodies were made by:
 Abbey: open 4-seater £275
 Swallow Coachbuilding (S. S.): open 2-seater £255 or 4-seater £260
 Kevill Davies & March: open 2 / 4-seater £289
 Maltby: open 4-seater £259, fixed head coupé £269
 Patrick: open 4-seater £250
 Jensen: fixed head coupé £275
 Eustace Watkins: Daytona open 2 / 4-seater £220, Ariel Tickford fixed head coupé £245
 John Seber: Wolsely Hornet Racer, open 2-seater

Swallow
Bodies on the Wolseley Hornet chassis fitted in well with Swallow's product range. They were the first 6-cylinder Swallows, production began in January 1931 with an open 2-seater. A 4-seater car followed in that autumn. In April 1932 the new Special chassis arrived and these cars were quite popular. They were the last of the special-bodied Swallows, replaced in the summer of 1933 by their SS1 tourer first announced in March 1933.
Production:
 Special Hornets: 2-seaters — 21; 4-seaters — 185
 standard Hornets: 2-seaters — 100+; 4-seaters — 224 (the quantity of 2-seaters made in the first part of 1931 is unknown)
Advertising slogan for the Wolseley Hornet-Swallow cars: "The Swallow touch that means so much".

Eustace Watkins

London and suburbs sole Wolseley distributor, Eustace Watkins Limited, designed and sourced their own E W Specials  probably from Abbey. Eustace Watkins provided the 2 / 4 seater Daytona and the Silex fixed-head coupé.

1604cc engine
For 1935 the Special was given the 1604 cc engine from the Wolseley Fourteen on the underslung 95in chassis but only 148 of these chassis were made.

Daytona Hornet Special road test by Sir Malcolm Campbell
Published Saturday 2 July 1932. Sir Malcolm, holder of the World's Land Speed Record, reported that the Daytona, one of the latest Hornet Specials was fitted with a sporting two / four seater body. The car's 1271cc engine was fitted with twin S.U. carburetters and he wrote it was pleasing to see particular attention had been paid to cooling and cleaning the engine oil. The motor was designed to turn at speeds up to 5,000 rpm which could be very quickly achieved in third gear. The maximum speed in top was in the region of 75 mph. Extra large 12-inch brake drums were fitted. Either Rudge Whitworth or Magna wheels were supplied. The front seats were reported to be comfortable with ample leg room for the tallest driver though the back seat could not be recommended for two people on a long run it was ideal for luggage protected from rain by a tonneau cover. Mudguards were of the cycle type and added to the appearance of the car.

"The engine is very near perfection . . . lively, vibrationless and exceedingly quiet, does its work without fuss or bother, quickly reaches 5,000 rpm and a road speed in third gear over 60 mph." "Steering is light, brakes are powerful and work smoothly and the suspension is good . . . when the gears are judiciously used the acceleration is really amazing."

However, Sir Malcolm regarded the clutch and brake pedals to be much too small and smoothly surfaced. He also regretted there was no external adjustment to the hydraulic shock absorbers which he considered necessary when dealing with such a light and fast little car.

Sir Malcolm summed up with: "This car is really a most attractive proposition. Its acceleration is so good that it would take a really powerful and well-tuned car to keep on its heels, and its upkeep is low."

References

Notes

External links

 A wonderful collection of reliable information, brochures, images, road tests etc at Pre-war Minor
 1933 brochure
 Wolseley Hornet Special Club
 Video with Hornet sound
 Conceptcarz shows a beautiful 1932 Hornet Special, many pictures

Hornet
1930s cars
Cars introduced in 1930